An isogenous group (lat. "equal origin") is a cluster of up to eight chondrocytes found in hyaline and elastic cartilage.

Formation 
Chondrocytes develop in the embryo from mesenchymal progenitor cells through a process known as chondrogenesis. A chondrocyte can then undergo mitosis to form an isogenous group within its lacuna.

Function 
Isogenous groups differentiate into individual chondrocytes where they continue to produce and deposit extracellular matrix (ECM), lengthening the cartilage and increasing its diameter. This is termed interstitial growth and is one of only two ways cartilage can grow.

See also 

Endochondral ossification
 Hyaline

References
Connective tissue cells